Metaemene hampsoni is a species of moth in the family Erebidae. It is found in Taiwan.

The wingspan is 16–28 mm.

References

Moths described in 1914
Boletobiinae
Moths of Japan